Mila - Quebec AI Institute (originally Montreal Institute for Learning Algorithms) is a research institute in Montreal, Quebec, focusing mainly on machine learning research. Approximately 1000 students and researchers and 100 faculty members, were part of Mila in 2022.

History 
Mila traces its foundations to the Laboratoire d'informatique des systèmes adaptatifs (LISA)  at the Université de Montréal and to the Reasoning and Learning Lab (RL-Lab) at McGill University. LISA was founded in 1993 by Yoshua Bengio, a Turing award winner and one of the founders of the field of deep learning while the RL-Lab was founded in 2001 and is currently co-directed by Professors Prakash Panangaden, Doina Precup, Joëlle Pineau, and Jackie Chi Kit Cheung.

In 2017, Mila-Quebec AI Institute was established as a partnership between the Université de Montréal and McGill University with École Polytechnique de Montréal and HEC Montréal.

In December 2020, Mila teamed up with IBM to accelerate artificial intelligence (AI) and machine learning research using open-source technology in a bid to integrate the Quebec institute’s open-source software, Oríon, with IBM’s Watson Machine Learning Accelerator, an AI model training and inference tool that the tech giant offers to businesses.

Notable researchers 
Besides Bengio, Mila's faculty members include Joëlle Pineau and Doina Precup. Some of its graduates include Marc Bellemare (MSc 2007 - RL-Lab), Hugo Larochelle (PhD 2009 - LISA) and Ian Goodfellow (PhD 2014 - LISA).

Research activities 
Research at Mila is largely, but not exclusively focused on deep learning and reinforcement learning. Specific research topics include:
 generative models
 natural language processing
 meta learning
 computer vision
 reinforcement learning
 applications of AI, including: climate change research and COVID-19 research.

Other activities 
Mila is both a research and educational institution, providing postdoc and internship positions, and providing a research environment for students enrolled in their respective universities and working towards their graduate degrees such as PhD and Master's degrees in machine learning.

Mila members have also contributed to open-source software. Theano, one of the early programming frameworks for deep learning originated at Mila. In 2020, active projects included myia, a deep learning framework for Python, and baby-ai, a platform for simulating language learning with a human in the loop.

In addition, Mila is also involved in numerous partnerships with private companies.

References

External links 
 Mila

Research institutes in Canada
McGill University
Université de Montréal
Artificial intelligence laboratories
1993 establishments in Quebec